Rachel Binx is an American data visualizer, developer, and designer. She is the co-founder of Meshu and Gifpop, two companies that create physical objects, such as maps and animated GIFs, from social data.

Binx has also worked at Stamen Design and NASA.

Early life and education

Binx is originally from New Mexico. In 2006, she moved to California to attend Santa Clara University, where she received a B.S. in Mathematics and a B.A. in Art History. After graduation, she freelanced in data visualization and web design.

Stamen Design
In 2011, Binx joined Stamen Design, a design and technology studio in San Francisco, California. At Stamen, Binx worked on projects for clients such as MTV, Facebook, and Oprah.

Business career
Binx has co-founded Meshu, Gifpop and monochōme, small companies that explore creating one-off physical objects from the data that customers find meaningful.

Meshu was co-founded with Sha Hwang, another Stamen alumni. Meshu is a service where people can upload geographic data from services, such as Foursquare, to be made into jewelry and accessories. The resulting 3D printed object is created from data points uploaded by the user.

Gifpop is a service for making physical GIFs. The service prints lenticular-printed cards from uploaded gif files. It was launched via a Kickstarter project that raised over $35,000 from more than 1,000 backers.

In 2014 Binx founded monochōme, a clothing company that allows customers to use map tiles from OpenStreetMap to create a custom print on various articles.

NASA Jet Propulsion Laboratory

In 2015, Binx joined the NASA Jet Propulsion Laboratory. Here, she builds  data visualization tools for rovers, satellites, and other space technology. Binx works as part of the human computer interaction research group building data visualization tools for mission evaluations.

References

External links

Living people
NASA
People from New Mexico
21st-century American businesspeople
21st-century American businesswomen
American women computer scientists
American computer scientists
Santa Clara University alumni
Jet Propulsion Laboratory faculty
Year of birth missing (living people)